Women's balance beam competition at the 2008 Summer Olympics was held on August 19 at the Beijing National Indoor Stadium.

The eight competitors (with a maximum of two per nation) with the highest scores in qualifying proceeded to the women's balance beam finals. There, each gymnast performed again; the scores from the final round (ignoring qualification) determined final ranking.

Medalists

Final

Qualified competitors

Only two gymnasts per country may advance to an event final. The following gymnasts scored high enough to qualify, but did not do so because two gymnasts from their country had already qualified ahead of them:

  (4th place)
  (8th place)
  (9th place)
  (10th place)
  (11th place)

The eventual final qualifier had the 13th highest balance beam score overall during qualification.

References
Notes

Sources
Balance beam final results
Balance beam qualification results
NYT Report

Gymnastics at the 2008 Summer Olympics
2008
2008 in women's gymnastics
Women's events at the 2008 Summer Olympics